Norman Charles Miller (born October 2, 1934) is an American journalist who worked for The Wall Street Journal.

Biography
Miller was born in Pittsburgh and attended Pennsylvania State University, where he earned his Bachelor of Arts in 1956. Miller won a Pulitzer Prize for Journalism in 1964 for his coverage of the scandal the unfolded around Tino De Angelis. Miller's reporting became the basis for his book, The Great Salad Oil Swindle published in 1965.

He was chief of the Journal'''s Washington bureau.

References

 Miller, Norman C. 1934–. Contemporary Authors. 37–40, First Revision, 391. 1979.The Great Salad Oil Swindle'' (Baltimore, MD: Penguin Books, 1965). by Norman C. Miller

1934 births
Living people
Pennsylvania State University alumni
The Wall Street Journal people
Journalists from Pennsylvania
Writers from Pittsburgh
Pulitzer Prize for Breaking News Reporting winners
20th-century American journalists
American male journalists